Kay Gerritsen (born 25 April 1997) is a Sint Maartener footballer who plays for FC Lisse of the Dutch Tweede Divisie, and the Sint Maarten national team.

Club career
Gerritsen began his career at FC VVC in Nieuw-Vennep where he stayed for a year and a half before joining FC Lisse. He played for Lisse through every youth level. He was promoted from the "B" to "A" team for the 2017–18 season. As part of preparation for the season, Gerritsen appeared in a friendly against Feyenoord. He made his league debut for the club on 3 February 2018 in a 3–0 victory over Achilles '29. After only one season with the first team, it was announced that the player would leave the club at the end of the season in hopes of earning more playing time at another club. In total, he spent over eight years with the club.

On 18 March 2019, it was announced that Gerritsen would join DSOV of the Eerste Klasse.

International career
Gerritsen was first called up to the  Sint Maarten national team in March 2019. He qualifies to represent the nation through his Dutch citizenship and spending two years on the island as a child before returning to the Netherlands. He made his first international appearance for the team on 23 March 2019 in a 2019–20 CONCACAF Nations League qualifying match against Saint Martin. He started the match and played the full ninety minutes in the eventual 4–3 victory, providing an assist on one of Sint Maarten's goals.

International goals
Scores and results list Sint Maarten's goal tally first.

International career statistics

References

External links
National Football Teams profile
Soccerway profile
VI profile

Living people
1997 births
Association football midfielders
Sint Maarten international footballers
Dutch Antillean footballers